The 2018–19 ICC T20 World Cup Asia Qualifier was the tournament played as part of qualification process for the 2021 ICC T20 World Cup.

Twelve regional qualifiers were held by the International Cricket Council (ICC), with 62 teams competed during 2018 in five regions – Africa (3 groups), Americas (2), Asia (2), East Asia Pacific (2) and Europe (3). The top 25 sides from these progressed to five Regional Finals in 2019, with seven teams then going on to compete in the 2019 ICC T20 World Cup Qualifier., along with the six lowest ranked sides from the ICC T20I Championship.

The first Asian sub-regional qualifier was held in Kuwait from 20 to 27 April 2018. The second sub-regional qualifier took place in Malaysia between 3 and 12 October 2018. The top three teams in each group advanced to the regional finals tournament, which will determine two Asian entrants to the 2019 ICC T20 World Cup Qualifier. In April 2018, the International Cricket Council (ICC) granted full international status to Twenty20 men's matches played between member sides from 1 January 2019 onwards. Therefore, all the matches in the Regional Finals will be played as Twenty20 Internationals (T20Is).

From the Western sub-region group, the United Arab Emirates were the first team to qualify for the regional final. They were joined by Qatar and Kuwait. From the Eastern sub-region group, Nepal, Singapore and Malaysia qualified for the regional final. However, in March 2019, the ICC announced that the UAE would host the qualifier tournament. Later the same month, the ICC released the match schedule for all the Regional Finals, with the UAE omitted from the Asia Regional Final. The number of teams that could qualify from the Asia Regional Final was also reduced from two to one.

The Regional Finals were held in Singapore in July 2019. Singapore progressed to the T20 World Cup Qualifier after winning the Regional Finals.

Teams

Western sub-region tournament

Points table

(H) Host. (Q) Advanced to the Regional Finals.
</noinclude>
Kuwait advanced to the Regional Finals after defeating Saudi Arabia in the third-place play-off match

Fixtures

Third-place play-off

Final

Eastern sub-region tournament

Points table 

 
(H) Host (Q) Qualified

Fixtures

Regional Finals

The Regional Finals were held in Singapore from 22 to 28 July 2019. The last match of the Finals, between Nepal and tournament hosts Singapore, saw the winner of the fixture, Singapore, qualify for the 2019 ICC T20 World Cup Qualifier. Kuwait's Muhammad Kashif was named the Player of the Series, after scoring 143 runs during the Finals.

Points table

Fixtures

Notes

References

External links
 Asia group at the International Cricket Council
 Series home at ESPN Cricinfo (Finals)

ICC Men's T20 World Cup Qualifier
2021 ICC Men's T20 World Cup
International cricket competitions in 2018–19
International cricket competitions in 2019